James Montgomery Doohan (March 3, 1920 – July 20, 2005) was a Canadian actor and author, best known for his role as Montgomery "Scotty" Scott in the television and film series Star Trek. Doohan's characterization of the Scottish Chief Engineer of the Starship Enterprise was one of the most recognizable elements in the Star Trek franchise, and inspired many fans to pursue careers in engineering and other technical fields. He also made contributions behind the scenes, such as the initial development of the Klingon and Vulcan languages.

Prior to his acting career, Doohan served in the 14th Field Artillery Regiment of the 3rd Canadian Infantry Division. He also served as a pilot. He saw combat in Europe during World War II, including the D-Day invasion of Normandy, in which he was wounded, apparently by friendly fire. After the war, he had extensive experience performing in radio and television, which led to his role as Scotty. Following the cancellation of the original Star Trek series, Doohan was typecast and had limited success in finding other roles; he returned to play the character in the animated and film continuations of the series, and made frequent appearances at Star Trek conventions.

Early life
Doohan was born in Vancouver, British Columbia, the youngest of four children of William Patrick Doohan and Sarah Frances (née Montgomery), who both emigrated from Bangor, Northern Ireland. His father, born in Belfast, was a pharmacist, veterinarian and dentist, and a member of the Pharmaceutical Society of Ireland. William Doohan owned a chemist shop in Main Street in Bangor, beside Trinity Presbyterian Church, and reportedly invented an early form of high-octane gasoline in 1923. Doohan's 1996 autobiography recounted his father's serious alcoholism.

The family moved from Vancouver to Sarnia, Ontario. Doohan attended high school at Sarnia Collegiate Institute and Technical School, where he excelled in mathematics and science. He enrolled in the 102nd Royal Canadian Army Cadet Corps in 1938.

Military service
In 1939 he enlisted with the Royal Canadian Artillery, 14th (Midland) Field Battery of the 2nd Canadian Infantry Division. From there, he was moved to the 13th Field Regiment of the Canadian 3rd Infantry Division in their 22nd Field Battery. By 1940 he was a Lieutenant and was sent to train in Britain prior to Operation Overlord. He first saw combat landing in the 2nd Wave in a Recce Party at Juno Beach on D-Day. The 13th Field Regiment was interspersed with the Regina Rifle Regiment landing at "Nan" Sector of Juno Beach. After shooting two snipers, Doohan led his men to higher ground through a field of anti-tank mines, where they took defensive positions for the night. Crossing between command posts at 23:30 that night, Doohan was hit by six rounds fired from a Bren gun by a nervous Canadian sentry: four in his leg, one in the chest, and one through his right middle finger. The bullet to his chest was stopped by a silver cigarette case given to him by his brother. His right middle finger had to be amputated, something he would conceal on-screen during most of his career as an actor, sometimes with a flesh-colored glove with a "faux finger."

Doohan graduated from Air Observation Pilot Course 40 with eleven other Canadian artillery officers and flew Taylorcraft Auster Mark V aircraft for 666 (AOP) Squadron, RCAF as a Royal Canadian Artillery officer in support of 1st Army Group Royal Canadian Artillery. All three Canadian (AOP) RCAF squadrons were crewed by artillery officer-pilots and accompanied by non-commissioned RCA and RCAF personnel serving as observers. Although he was never actually a member of the Royal Canadian Air Force, Doohan was once labelled the "craziest pilot in the Canadian Air Force". In the late spring of 1945, on Salisbury Plain north of RAF Andover, he slalomed a plane between telegraph poles "to prove it could be done", earning himself a serious reprimand. (Various accounts cite the plane as a Hurricane or a jet trainer; however, it was an Auster Mark IV.)

Early acting career
After the war, Doohan moved to London, Ontario, for further technical education. After hearing a radio drama and believing he could do better, he recorded his voice at the local radio station, and learned about a drama school in Toronto. There he won a two-year scholarship to the Neighborhood Playhouse in New York City, where his classmates included Leslie Nielsen, Tony Randall and Richard Boone.

In 1946, he had several roles for CBC radio, starting January 12. For several years, he shuttled between Toronto and New York as work demanded. He made his TV debut as a detective on the show Martin Kane, Private Eye, and appeared in 54 episodes. He estimated he performed in over 4,000 radio programs and 450 television programs during this period, and earned a reputation for versatility.

In the mid-1950s, he appeared as forest ranger Timber Tom (the northern counterpart of Buffalo Bob) in the Canadian version of Howdy Doody. Coincidentally, fellow Star Trek cast member William Shatner appeared simultaneously as Ranger Bill in the American version. Doohan and Shatner both appeared in the 1950s Canadian science fiction series Space Command. Doohan also appeared in several episodes of Hawkeye and the Last of the Mohicans in 1957-58.

For GM Presents, he played the lead role in the CBC TV drama Flight into Danger (1956), then in The Night they Killed Joe Howe (1960). (Arthur Hailey rewrote the former into the novel Runway Zero-Eight, then adapted to Terror in the Sky. This story was later satirized in Airplane!.)

Doohan's credits included The Twilight Zone, Season 4, Episode 3 "Valley of the Shadow" (17 January 1961), GE True, Hazel, "Hazel's Highland Fling" as Gordon "Gordy" MacHeath. The Outer Limits, The Fugitive, Bewitched, Fantasy Island, Magnum, P.I., The Man from U.N.C.L.E. (Season 1, Episode 4 "The Shark Affair" (1964); Season 2, Episode 20 "The Bridge of Lions Affair, Part 1" (1966)) and Bonanza. In the Bonanza episode "Gift of Water" (1962), he co-starred with actress Majel Barrett who would later play Star Treks Nurse Christine Chapel. He played an assistant to the United States president in two episodes of Voyage to the Bottom of the Sea. He had an uncredited role in The Satan Bug (1965), appeared in the Daniel Boone episode "A Perilous Passage" (1970), appeared as a state trooper in Roger Vadim's film Pretty Maids All in a Row (1971, which was produced by Star Trek creator Gene Roddenberry), and played opposite Richard Harris in the movie Man in the Wilderness (1971).

Star Trek

Doohan developed a talent for accents as a child. Auditioning for the role of chief engineer of the USS Enterprise, Doohan did several different accents. Producer Gene Roddenberry asked which he preferred, and Doohan replied, "If you want an engineer, in my experience the best engineers are Scotsmen." He chose the name "Montgomery Scott" after his grandfather. In later years, Doohan reenacted the casting process at Star Trek conventions, demonstrating a variety of possible voices and characters.

Doohan was quoted as saying, "Scotty is ninety-nine percent James Doohan and one percent accent." The character was originally conceived as semi-regular; but was elevated to be a regular supporting character. Doohan also provided voices for inanimate characters, including Sargon in "Return to Tomorrow", the M-5 in "The Ultimate Computer", the Mission Control Voice in "Assignment: Earth", and the Oracle in "For the World Is Hollow and I Have Touched the Sky".

Doohan returned to the role of Scotty in the early 1970s for Star Trek: The Animated Series. Walter Koenig (navigator Pavel Chekov) was not hired for this series due to budget limitations, so Doohan voiced a replacement character: alien navigator Arex. He also voiced most guest male roles, including that of Robert April, the first captain of the Enterprise and around 50 other roles, voicing as many as seven different characters in a single episode.

He rejoined the entire regular cast of Star Trek for the feature film Star Trek: The Motion Picture (1979), for which he also devised the Vulcan and Klingon language dialogue. He continued in the role of Scotty for sequels The Wrath of Khan, The Search for Spock, The Voyage Home, The Final Frontier and The Undiscovered Country. In 1992, he guest-starred in the Star Trek: The Next Generation episode "Relics", playing an elderly Scotty reminiscing about his time on the Enterprise. He and Walter Koenig appeared briefly with William Shatner in Star Trek Generations, in a scene which transitioned the film series to the newer cast of the first of the later television series in the franchise.

After Star Trek

Doohan hoped that Star Trek would benefit his acting career. After the series ended, however, he found himself typecast and had a hard time gaining other roles. After his dentist reminded him he would "always be Scotty", he supported his family with income from personal appearances.

Most of the roles Doohan subsequently played made at least oblique references to his Star Trek connection and engineering reputation. He was Commander Canarvin in the short-lived Saturday morning live-action kids' show Jason of Star Command, and had a cameo in the made-for-TV movie Knight Rider 2000 as "Jimmy Doohan, the guy who played Scotty on Star Trek". On the television series Homeboys in Outer Space, he was Pippen, a pun on Scotty and basketball star Scottie Pippen. He played himself in an episode of The Ben Stiller Show. He played Damon Warwick, father of James Warwick, on the daytime soap opera The Bold and the Beautiful. After learning about cold fusion from technical journals in 1989, he narrated the video "Cold Fusion: Fire from Water", about the physics behind cold fusion.

When the Star Trek franchise was revived, Doohan reprised his role of Scotty in seven Star Trek films. Many of Doohan's film appearances centred on the role of Scotty, such as a cameo in National Lampoon's Loaded Weapon 1, where he plays a policeman doing repair work who tells his superior officer "I am giving it all she has got, Captain!" in the same accent he used in Star Trek.

Although he continued to work with William Shatner in the Star Trek films, Doohan did not get along well with him and was once quoted as saying, "I like Captain Kirk, but I sure don't like Bill." He was the only former Star Trek co-star to decline to be interviewed by Shatner for Shatner's first Star Trek: Memories book about the show, nor did he consent to do so for Shatner's follow-up book, Star Trek: Movie Memories, though Shatner mentioned in the latter that the icy relationship between the two started to thaw when both men were working on Star Trek Generations in 1993-94. At Doohan's final August 2004 convention appearance, Doohan and Shatner appeared to have mended their relationship.

Inspiration
Many fans told Doohan over the years that it was he who inspired them to choose engineering as a profession. Astronaut Neil Armstrong, an engineer before he participated in NASA's Apollo program, becoming the first man on the moon, personally told Doohan on stage at Doohan's last public appearance in 2004, "From one old engineer to another, thanks, mate."

In an interview for the first Trekkies film, Doohan related the story of a young fan who was contemplating suicide. Doohan says that he convinced her to attend his next convention appearance, and later learned that his encouragement and kind words had not only saved her life, but inspired her to go back to school and become an electronics engineer.

Personal life

Doohan was married three times and had seven children, four of themincluding Christopherwith his first wife Janet Young, whom he divorced in 1964. His marriage to Anita Yagel in 1967–72 produced no children. In early 1974, he was introduced to 17-year-old fan Wende Braunberger at a theatre performance. They were married that same year, when they were 54 and 18, on October 12, 1974. Star Trek guest actor William Campbell served as best man. Doohan and Braunberger had three children: Eric, Thomas, and lastly, Sarah in April 2000, around his 80th birthday. In his later years, Doohan suffered a multitude of health problems partially from his lifestyle, which included prodigious alcohol consumption, and partially from injuries sustained during World War II. These included diabetes, liver cirrhosis, osteoarthritis, high blood pressure, and hearing loss. In July 2004, he announced that he was suffering from Alzheimer's disease and Parkinson's disease and would be withdrawing from public life.

His sons Montgomery and Christopher appeared in Star Trek: The Motion Picture (1979). Christopher also appeared in the J. J. Abrams reboot Star Trek (2009). Simon Pegg, who played Scotty in the film, invited Chris and his family to the premiere. For Star Trek Into Darkness in 2012, fans campaigned for Christopher Doohan gaining him a credited cameo in the transporter room. Chris Doohan played Scotty in the award-winning web series Star Trek Continues.

Death
On July 20, 2005, at 5:30 in the morning, Doohan died at his home in Redmond, Washington, due to complications of pulmonary fibrosis, which was believed to be from exposure to noxious substances during World War II. His body was subsequently cremated.

A portion of his ashes, ¼ ounce (7 grams), was scheduled the following fall for a memorial flight to space with 308 others, including Project Mercury astronaut Gordon Cooper. Launch on the SpaceLoft XL rocket was delayed to April 28, 2007, when the rocket briefly entered outer space in a four-minute suborbital flight before parachuting to earth, as planned, with the ashes still inside. The ashes were subsequently launched on a Falcon 1 rocket, on August 3, 2008, into what was intended to be a low Earth orbit; however, the rocket failed two minutes after launch. Some of Doohan's ashes are hidden under the floor cladding of the International Space Station's Columbus module - after being smuggled aboard in 2008 by Richard Garriott. The rest of Doohan's ashes were scattered over Puget Sound in Washington. On May 22, 2012, a small urn containing some of Doohan's remains in ash form was flown into space aboard the Falcon 9 rocket as part of COTS Demo Flight 2.

Legacy

Scotty's exploits as the Enterprises redoubtable chief engineer inspired many students to pursue careers in engineering. Because of this, the Milwaukee School of Engineering presented Doohan with an honorary degree in engineering. Doohan was immortalized with a star on the Hollywood Walk of Fame on August 31, 2004. Despite his ill health, he was present at the ceremony, which was his final public appearance.

Montgomery Scott was claimed by Linlithgow, Scotland, in 2007 by a commemorative plaque from the West Lothian Council for Doohan's importance. His birthplace is also attributed to Aberdeen, where Doohan learned the doric accent, or Elgin. In the actual show, Scotty refers to himself as a one-time "Aberdeen pub-crawler", the only reference Doohan's character ever makes to a specific place in Scotland where he lived. However, Scotty's accent chosen by Doohan is not the relatively harsh Aberdonian accent; the specific accent Doohan used implies most of Scotty's formative years were spent at or near Edinburgh, something that is supported by original script notes.

Filmography

Film

Television

Video games

Bibliography
Autobiography
 

Science fiction novels (The Flight Engineer series)

See also
"Beam me up, Scotty", the phrase referring to Doohan's character, Montgomery "Scotty" Scott.
 List of oldest fathers

References

Further reading

External links

 
 
 

 

1920 births
2005 deaths
20th-century Canadian male actors
20th-century Canadian male writers
20th-century Canadian novelists
20th-century memoirists
21st-century Canadian male actors
Canadian amputees
Royal Regiment of Canadian Artillery personnel
Royal Regiment of Canadian Artillery officers
Canadian military personnel from British Columbia
Canadian emigrants to the United States
Canadian expatriate male actors in the United States
Canadian male film actors
Canadian male non-fiction writers
Canadian male novelists
Canadian male television actors
Canadian male voice actors
Canadian memoirists
Canadian Army personnel of World War II
Canadian people of Irish descent
Canadian people of Northern Ireland descent
Canadian science fiction writers
Canadian World War II pilots
Deaths from pneumonia in Washington (state)
Deaths from pulmonary fibrosis
Male actors from Vancouver
Male actors from Washington (state)
Neighborhood Playhouse School of the Theatre alumni
People from Redmond, Washington
People with Alzheimer's disease
People with Parkinson's disease
Space burials
Writers from Vancouver
Writers from Washington (state)